Arbouet-Sussaute is a commune in the Pyrénées-Atlantiques department in the Nouvelle-Aquitaine of south-western France.

The inhabitants of the commune are known as Arbotiar.

Geography
Arbouet-Sussaute is located in the former province of Lower Navarre some 30 km south-east of Peyrehorade and 5 km north-east of Saint-Palais. The D933 road from Saint-Palais in the south-west passes north through the western part of the commune and continues to Osserain-Rivareyte. Access to the village is by the D134 road from the D29 in the north passing south through the village and the commune and continuing south to join the D11 just west of Domezain-Berraute. The intercity bus network of Pyrénées-Atlantiques currently has a stop on its route 865 which goes from Saint-Palais to Orthez. There is also the hamlet of Sussaute to the south-east of the village. A disused line of railway passes from the north to the south-west through the commune.

Located in the Drainage basin of the Adour, the commune is traversed 3 by tributaries of the Bidouze: the Ruisseau de Récalde and the Lauhirasse and its tributary the Berd.

Historical places and hamlets

 Achtokotcho
 Ahutchunia
 Alguria
 Amensteya
 Arbouet
 Arosteguy
 Arracouenia
 Arracumbeheria
 Arrain
 Beheity
 Bel Air
 Bellaix
 Berhamborda
 Bidetoua
 Bordagnia
 Celhay
 Chapar
 Church of Sussaute
 Copaenia
 Elgart
 Etchart
 Gallos
 Hachgarat
 Harambure
 Idiartia
 Iratchetoa
 Joanconia
 Lacounia
 Landutchia
 Larramendy
 Laugueroteguia
 Léchénia
 Lessaho
 Mendibure
 Mendiscoua
 Mendiskoborda
 Mitchot
 Ochaharretta
 Orania
 Oxobiçale
 Pochulia
 Putchetenia
 Salanbeheria
 Sallaberry
 Saspithurry
 Sussaute
 Urchamendy

Toponymy
The commune name in basque is Arboti-Zohota.

According to Jean-Baptiste Orpustan Arboti is the spelling preserved in basque but the meaning is uncertain. If it is from the Latin (borrowed from arbor(e)), the name may signify a wooded place. For Zohota (Sussaute) he suggests a basque origin of zozoeta meaning "Place of blackbirds".

The following table details the origins of the commune name and other names in the commune.

Sources:
Orpustan: Jean-Baptiste Orpustan, New Basque Toponymy p. 66-67
Raymond: Topographic Dictionary of the Department of Basses-Pyrenees, 1863, on the page numbers indicated in the table. 
Cassini: Cassini Map from 1750
Ldh/EHESS/Cassini: 

Origins:
Notaries: Notaries of Labastide-Villefranche
Biscay: Martin Biscay
Navarrenx: Notaries of Navarrenx
Pamplona: Titles of Pamplona
Mixe: Titles of Mixe

History
The village of Sussaute was joined with Arbouet on 14 June 1842.

Administration

List of Successive Mayors

Inter-communality
The commune is part of six inter-communal structures:
The Communauté d'agglomération du Pays Basque;
the AEP association of Mixe Country;
the Education regrouping association of Arbérats-Sillègue, Arbouet-Sussaute, Aroue, and Etcharry;
the Energy association of Pyrénées-Atlantiques;
the inter-communal association for the functioning of schools in Amikuze;
the association for the promotion of Basque culture.

Demography
In 1350 there were 11 fires in Sussaute.

The fiscal census of 1412–1413, made on the orders of Charles III of Navarre, compared with the census of men and weapons that are in this Kingdom of Navarre below the ports in 1551 reveals a demography with strong growth. The first indicated the presence in Arbouet of 12 fires, the second with 31 (24 + 7 secondary fires). Similarly in Sussaute, the census of 1412-1413 had 7 fires while that of 1551 had 23 (19 + 4 side lights).
 
The census of the population of Lower Navarre in 1695 counted 52 fires in Arbouet and 50 in Sussaute.

In 2017 the commune had 322 inhabitants. The population data given in the table and graph below include the former commune of Sussaute, absorbed in 1842.

Economy
The commune is part of the Appellation d'origine contrôlée (AOC) zone of Ossau-iraty.

Culture and Heritage

Religious heritage
The Parish Church of Saint John the Baptist (1860) is registered as an historical monument.

Amenities

Education

The town has a kindergarten.

Picture Gallery

See also
Communes of the Pyrénées-Atlantiques department

References

External links
Arboüet and Sußaute on the 1750 Cassini Map

Communes of Pyrénées-Atlantiques
Lower Navarre